Antonius Johannes Petrus Poels (born 27 July 1963 in Oeffelt) is a retired Dutch professional cyclist.

In 1984, Poels rode the road race in the 1984 Summer Olympics as a member of the Dutch team, but did not finish.

Poels became a professional cyclist in 1985 for the  team. He rode the Tour de France five times, finishing every time. After his professional career, he became an estate agent.

See also
 List of Dutch Olympic cyclists

References

External links

1963 births
Living people
Cyclists at the 1984 Summer Olympics
Dutch male cyclists
Olympic cyclists of the Netherlands
People from Boxmeer
Dutch real estate brokers
Cyclists from North Brabant